Acronicta browni is a moth of the family Noctuidae. It is found in North America, including California.

External links
California Moth Specimens

Acronicta
Moths of North America
Moths described in 2000